Aly Mustafayev Mustafa oglu (April 14, 1952 – November 20, 1991) was an Azerbaijani journalist and reporter during the Nagorno-Karabakh conflict.

Early years
Mustafayev was born on April 14, 1952, in Qazakhbeyli village of Qazakh raion of Azerbaijan SSR. In 1969, he completed his secondary education at Dash Salakhly village secondary school. From 1971 through 1973, Mustafayev served in the Soviet Armed Forces. In 1976, he entered Baku State University and graduated in 1981 with a degree in journalism. After the graduation, he started working for News program of the Azerbaijani State Television and Radio company. When the Nagorno-Karabakh war started, Mustafayev was assigned to report from the frontlines.

Death
Mustafayev was killed along with 22 passengers and crew members in a helicopter which was shot down by Armenian forces near the Qarakend village of Khojavend district in Nagorno-Karabakh, Azerbaijan. There were no survivors of the crash.

Ali Mustafayev was buried at a Martyrs' Lane cemetery in Baku. He was posthumously awarded the title of the National Hero of Azerbaijan. Mustafayev was also awarded the title of Honored Journalist of the Republic. A school in Baku, capital of Azerbaijan was named after him.

See also
1991 Azerbaijani Mil Mi-8 shootdown
Chingiz Mustafayev
Osman Mirzayev
National Hero of Azerbaijan

References

Assassinated Azerbaijani journalists
Journalists from Baku
1952 births
1991 deaths
People from Qazax District
Journalists killed while covering the Nagorno-Karabakh War
National Heroes of Azerbaijan
People murdered in Azerbaijan
Azerbaijani people of the Nagorno-Karabakh War
Victims of aircraft shootdowns
20th-century journalists